The Equality Network is one of Scotland's national organisations working for LGBTI rights and equality. Established by LGBT activists in 1997, it is a registered charity and a company limited by guarantee (no. SC220213), based in Edinburgh. In 2011 it had an income of £374,000.

History
The Equality Network was founded back in 1997 as a national organisation working for LGBT rights and equality in Scotland and 2014 for LGBTI rights and equality in Scotland. The Equality Network has superseded the work of Outright Scotland.

It is a registered charity governed by a Board of Trustees. It has received funding from some of the following organisations: the Equality Unit of the Scottish Government, the Grundtvig programme of the European Commission, the Equality and Human Rights Commission, the Big Lottery Fund and the Awards for All programme. It also raises money from individuals across Scotland.

Work
Over the past 17 years the Equality Network has claimed a number of victories for LGBT equality in Scotland including an equal age of consent, the repeal of Section 28, Civil Partnerships, Gender Recognition, adoption and fertility rights, hate crime laws, and most recently same-sex marriage.

Scottish Trans Alliance 
The Scottish Trans Alliance is a project within the Equality Network to "improve gender identity and gender reassignment equality, rights and inclusion in Scotland". Scottish Trans Alliance has three full-time staff working for the Equality Network. Vic Valentine is manager of the group.

Previously, James Morton was manager of Scottish Trans Alliance. Morton is the author of A Scottish History of Trans Equality Activism.

Awards
The Equality Network won the Campaign of the Year Award at the Herald Society Awards 2012, and Campaign of the Year at the LGBT Youth Scotland Awards 2012, both for the Equal Marriage campaign — the UK's first campaign for same-sex marriage rights, established by the Equality Network in 2008. It was also shortlisted for Public Campaign of the Year at the Scottish Politician of the Year Awards 2012.

See also
 LGBT rights in Scotland
 Community Development Alliance Scotland 
 Pride Scotia
 Pauline McNeill
 Nora Radcliffe

Other national LGBT organisations:
 LGBT Youth Scotland
 LGBT Network
 Stonewall Scotland
 Time for Inclusive Education

Other national organisations with a substantial LGBT remit:
 Equality and Human Rights Commission
 Scottish Trades Union Congress

Other national equality and human rights organisations:
 Amnesty International Scotland
 Black and Ethnic Minorities Infrastructure in Scotland
 Parliament Equal Opportunities Committee
 Scottish Council for Voluntary Organisations
 Scottish Inter Faith Council
 Scottish Government Equality Unit

References

External links 
 

1997 establishments in Scotland
1997 in LGBT history
1997 in politics
Charities based in Edinburgh
Educational policies and initiatives of the European Union
Human rights organisations based in the United Kingdom
LGBT organisations in Scotland
LGBT rights in Scotland
Organisations supported by the Scottish Government
Political advocacy groups in Scotland